Chalaneh, also rendered as Chilaneh and Chalani, may refer to:
 Chalaneh-ye Olya